Hans Vollmer (16 November 1878 – 15 February 1969) was a German art historian.

Life 
His father was the architect  (1845-1920), his grandfather of the Hamburg marine painter and sculptor Adolph Friedrich Vollmer (1806–1875). He was the older brother of the painter and sculptor Erwin Vollmer (1884–1973). 

Vollmer studied art history, history of sciences and philosophy in Berlin and Munich. In 1906 he was awarded a doctorate by Heinrich Wölfflin in Berlin with a thesis on Schwäbische Monumentalbrunnen von der Gotik bis zum Klassizismus (Swabian monumental fountains from the Gothic to the Classicism).

Since April 1, 1907 he was employed in the editorial office of the [[Thieme-Becker|Thieme-Becker Allgemeiner Künstlerlexikon]] at the publishing house E. A. Seemann in Leipzig, in 1923 he took over the editorial management and became editor of the Thieme-Becker company. He worked as the main contributor, supported by a small editorial staff, until the completion of the 37-volume work in 1950, after which he began working on the additions for the General Encyclopedia of Visual Artists of the XXth Century, which appeared in six volumes from 1953 to 1962. In 1952 he was appointed professor. In recognition of his work Vollmer received the Patriotic Order of Merit in silver of the German Democratic Republic in 1957.

On 1 January 1964 Vollmer retired after 57 years of work for the Künstlerlexikon. He died in Leipzig at age 90.

 Publications 
 Schwäbische Monumentalbrunnen. (Kunstgeschichtliche Studien, issue 1). Ebering, Berlin 1906.
 Kunstgeschichtliches Wörterbuch. (Teubners kleine Fachwörterbücher 13). Teubner, Leipzig 1928.
 Was mußt Du als Staatsbürger wissen? Literature 
 Magdalena George (ed.): Festschrift Hans Vollmer. Aus Anlass seiner fünfzigjährigen Tätigkeit als Mitarbeiter und Herausgeber des Thieme-Becker. VEB E. A. Seemann Verlag, Leipzig 1957 (with Schriftenverzeichnis; Digitalisat).
 Alfred Langer: Kunstliteratur und Reproduktion. 125 Jahre Seemann-Verlag im Dienste der Erforschung und Verbreitung der Kunst''. E. A. Seemann, Leipzig 1983, (with picture).

References

External links 
 

German art historians
Recipients of the Patriotic Order of Merit in silver
1878 births
1969 deaths
People from Charlottenburg